Motion is a change in position of an object over time.

Motion(s) or The Motion(s) may also refer to:

Law and government
 Motion (legal), a procedural device in law
 Motion (parliamentary procedure), a formal proposal by a member of a deliberative assembly

Mathematics, science and technology 
 Motion (geometry), a type of transformation in various geometrical studies
 Motion graphics, animation or digital footage that creates the illusion of motion
 Motion (software), a motion graphics software application by Apple
 Motion (surveillance software), a software motion detector surveillance system for Linux
 Motion, the connecting rods and valve-gear of a steam locomotive

Music

Groups
 Pete Nischt and the Motions, an American band
 The Motions (band), a Dutch rock band 1964–1970

Albums 
 Motion (Calvin Harris album), 2014
 Motion (The Cinematic Orchestra album), 1999
 Motion (Lee Konitz album), 1961
 Motion (Tresor album), 2021
 Motion (EP), by the Mayfield Four, 1997
 Motion, by Almah, 2011
 Motion, by Eumir Deodato, 1984
 Motion, by Geoff Muldaur, 1976
 Motions, an EP by Jeremy Zucker, 2017

Songs 
 "The Motions" (song), by Matthew West, 2009
 "Motion", by Khalid from Suncity, 2018
 "The Motion", a song by Drake from Care Package, 2019
 "The Motions", by Dashboard Confessional from Alter the Ending, 2009

Places
 Motion, California, a community in the United States
 The Motion, a settlement in Newfoundland and Labrador, Canada

People 
 Alice Motion (born 1984), British chemist
 Andrew Motion (born 1952), English poet laureate
 H. Graham Motion (born 1964), England-born American horse trainer

Other uses
 Motion (gridiron football), movement by an offensive player at the start of a play
 The Motion Lounge, a defunct nightclub in Williamsburg, Brooklyn, New York
 Motion, a 2009–2015 outdoor travel TV program on the Live Well Network

See also 
 Locomotion (disambiguation)
 Move (disambiguation)
 Perpetual motion (disambiguation)
 Self-motion (disambiguation)